The women's 400 metres event at the 1990 Commonwealth Games was held on 27 and 28 January at the Mount Smart Stadium in Auckland.

Medalists

Results

Heats
Qualification: First 4 of each heat (Q) and the next 1 fastest (q) qualified for the final.

Final

References

400
1990
1990 in women's athletics